Nick Frisby (born 29 October 1992 in Brisbane, Australia) is an Australian international rugby union player who plays with the Western Force in Super Rugby AU. His regular playing position is scrum-half.

Rugby Union career

Amateur career

Frisby's local club side was GPS Rugby, who play in the Queensland Premier Rugby Competition.

Frsiby has been drafted to Stirling County in the Scottish Premiership for the 2018-19 season.

Professional career

Nick Frisby made his debut for the Queensland Reds against the Durban Sharks in round 4 of the 2012 Super Rugby season at Suncorp Stadium. Frisby came off the bench in the 47th minute of the match going on to play 33 minutes. Unfortunately it was not a dream debut even after scoring a try with the Reds losing 22-27.

In the 2014 National Rugby Championship Frisby was one of the competition's best, turning out for Brisbane City leading them to their inaugural title in a 37-26 victory over the Perth Spirit at Ballymore Stadium.

During a disappointing 2015 season for the Queensland Reds team, Frisby started seven matches at flyhalf due to the unavailability of injured star Quade Cooper. Frisby playing out of position earned praise for his efforts so much so being invited into a Wallabies training in Brisbane with head coach Michael Cheika.

Prior to 2016, Frisby gained the majority of his Queensland Reds caps on the bench being the second pick scrum-half to Will Genia. 

On 7 July 2018 it was announced that Frisby was signed by Glasgow Warriors.

He made his first appearance for the Warriors in their 50 -17 demolition of Harlequins at North Inch, Perth on the 18 August 2018, even scoring on debut.

International career

Frisby was named in the Australia under 20 team that competed in the 2012 IRB Junior World Championship in South Africa.
Nick Frisby has earned his first Wallabies squad call-up in 2016, after an impressive Super Rugby season with the Reds. Frisby has played a number of roles for Queensland in recent years but with the departure of Will Genia has made the starting nine spot his own, catching the eye of Michael Cheika.
During 2016, Frisby played in all 3 test matches against England as well as the Bledisode Cup against the All Blacks and went on to travel and play on the Wallabies Spring tour.

References

External links 
 Reds profile
 itsrugby.co.uk
 IRB profile

1992 births
Australian rugby union players
Queensland Reds players
Brisbane City (rugby union) players
Rugby union scrum-halves
Rugby union players from Brisbane
Living people
Glasgow Warriors players
Union Bordeaux Bègles players
Stirling County RFC players
Australia international rugby union players
Western Force players
Australian expatriate rugby union players
Australian expatriate sportspeople in France
Australian expatriate sportspeople in Scotland
Expatriate rugby union players in France
Expatriate rugby union players in Scotland